The remote chub (Algansea avia) is a species of freshwater fish in the family Cyprinidae that is endemic to the Grande de Santiago River basin at an altitude of  in west-central Mexico.

References

Algansea
Fish described in 1978
Freshwater fish of Mexico
Endemic fish of Mexico
Río Grande de Santiago